Moekeshiwan, also known as Lvinaya Past (literally "Lion's Maw", after a rock that emerges from the sea and resembles a sleeping lion), is a volcano in the southern part of Iturup in the Kuril Islands, claimed by Japan and administered by Russia. The volcano is characterized by a large caldera that is flooded by the Sea of Okhotsk. A large eruption occurred early during the Holocene which reached a volcanic explosivity index of 7.

Iturup island contains about nine stratovolcanoes, some pyroclastic cones, one somma volcano and several geothermal fields. The caldera lies close to the southernmost point of Iturup and is flanked to the east by the Urbich volcano and to the southwest by the Berutarube volcano. The isthmuses east and southwest of Lvinaya Past are covered by its eruption products.

Large eruptions took place 13,000 and 12,300 years ago, and a major eruption occurred 7480 ± 80 BC. The submarine caldera formed during this eruption and heavily altered the topography on Iturup, generating an ignimbrite which joined the three southernmost volcanoes of Iturup to the main island. This eruption had a volcanic explosivity index of 7, making it one of the largest eruptions that are known to have occurred in the Kuril Islands, and the strongest known to have occurred during the Holocene in the Southern Kurils. 

Ice cores taken in the Siberian Altai demonstrate increased sulfate concentrations at the time, possibly stemming from large sulfate release by the eruptions of Lvinaya Past and contemporaneous large scale activity at Caldera Fisher in Alaska and Pinatubo in the Philippines and may relate to the Younger Dryas event. The development of alder-containing birch forests in the region may have been favoured by the ash fall from the eruption, which would have killed more susceptible conifers. The impact of the eruption may have extended all the way to southern North America.

Lvinaya Past has erupted tholeiitic magmas with a low potassium content. Other rocks include andesite, basaltic andesite, basalt, dacite and picrite. The caldera-forming eruption ejected dacitic material with hornblende and quartz forming phenocrysts. Other volcanoes on Iturup include Astonupuri, Baransky, Berutarube, Bogatyr Ridge, Chirip, Demon, Golets-Tornyi, Grozny Group, Medvezhy and Past.

See also
List of volcanoes in Russia

References 

Iturup
Calderas of Russia
Calderas of Japan
Submarine calderas
VEI-7 volcanoes
Holocene calderas
Inactive volcanoes
Volcanoes of the Kuril Islands